Alice M. Hayes (1862/63–1913) was a British horse trainer.  Married to the veterinarian and horse expert Horace Hayes she was well travelled and an expert at breaking-in.  Hayes demonstrated her riding skills on the most difficult of horses and once, in India, rode a zebra sidesaddle.  She wrote The Horsewoman in 1893, a guide to riding for ladies, in which she strongly opposed the adoption of the cross saddle position used traditionally by men.  Hayes was a supporter of women lepers in India.  She secured additional help for them from the government and donated the proceeds from her book to leper hospitals.

Biography 
Hayes was the daughter of  William Pyett of Esher, Surrey.  She was married to British Army veterinarian and author Captain Horace Hayes, who was 20 years older than her.  Horace described Alice as  "musical, a clever actress, and born to shine in society".

Alice Hayes was a seasoned traveller, accompanying her husband on his many trips across the world.  She became skilled at breaking-in horses and, at her husband's demonstrations of horse training techniques, often rode the fiercest of horses that had been rejected as untrainable by tougher men.  In Calcutta, India, Hayes rode a mountain zebra that her husband had broken-in.  She recalled the animal as being a fierce kicker and sensitive to any touch on his ears.  She noted that it was impossible to rein in because of his thick neck and small dewlap and, though she admired the zebra's "seal-like" skin, regarded him as "too neck-strong to make a pleasant mount for a lady".  She thought that she was the first woman to have ridden a mountain zebra.

Hayes wrote The Horsewoman in 1893 which focussed on explaining the traditional sidesaddle riding technique to ladies.  The work became popular again in the early 21st century as there was a revival of interest in the technique.  Hayes acknowledged that the technique had disadvantages when compared to the men's cross saddle position, in that a rider in sidesaddle is less able to exert control over the horse and is in greater danger if the horse rears.  However, she still believed that the technique was the only proper one for a woman and that those who supported the cross saddle position for women were "either mad or wholly ignorant" as Hayes considered the position to be "most ungraceful" for ladies.  Hayes instructed women at Ward's Riding School in Brompton Road, London.  Her approach was to initially focus on posture alone, with an instructor controlling the horse.  She had pupils clad in bloomers and tunics, so she could observe their leg positions.  This approach allowed the pupil to experience horse jumping as early as their second lesson and was praised in Queen magazine as providing results "in so short a space of time".

Hayes was a supporter of less privileged women.  She was particularly concerned with the plight of female lepers in India.  She regularly visited leper hospitals and donated to them the royalties from her book.  Hayes wrote articles to raise awareness of the condition and her  actions led the Indian Government to make additional provisions for women lepers.  Horace died in 1904 and Hayes died at Wimborne, Dorset, nine years later.  The couple had no children.

References 

1860s births
1913 deaths
British horse trainers
Writers on horsemanship
English female equestrians
19th-century English women writers